During the 1996–97 season Bologna Football Club 1909 competed in Serie A and Coppa Italia.

Summary 
Newcomers in Serie A, Bologna, finished in a decent 7th place almost reaching an UEFA Cup spot. In Coppa Italia, the squad reached the semifinals defeated by future champions Vicenza of Francesco Guidolin.

Manager Renzo Ulivieri built a balanced squad with experienced players and young stars emerging during the campaign included former goalkeeper Francesco Antonioli, defenders Michele Paramatti, Stefano Torrisi and Giuseppe Cardone. Meanwhile, the offensive saw the Russian duo: former Inter midfielder Igor Shalimov and forward Igor Kolyvanov was able to play as a pure striker once again, without having responsibilities across the entire field like in Foggia. This immediately reflected on his goal scoring, and he was Bologna's top striker in his first season, with 11 goals in 27 games. Also Swedish striker Kennet Andersson, whom arrived in the summer from relegated A.S. Bari, had a decent campaign.

Squad

Transfers

Competitions

Serie A

League table

Results by round

Matches

Coppa Italia

Second round

Eightfinals

Quarterfinals

Semifinals

Statistics

Squad Statistics

Player Statistics 

|}

References

Bibliography

External links 
 
 

Bologna F.C. 1909 seasons
Bologna